Abortion is the termination of a pregnancy by removal or expulsion of an embryo or fetus. An abortion that occurs without intervention is known as a miscarriage or "spontaneous abortion"; these occur in approximately 30% to 40% of pregnancies. When deliberate steps are taken to end a pregnancy, it is called an induced abortion, or less frequently "induced miscarriage". The unmodified word abortion generally refers to an induced abortion. The reasons why women have abortions are diverse and vary across the world. Reasons include maternal health, an inability to afford a child, domestic violence, lack of support, feeling they are too young, wishing to complete education or advance a career, and not being able or willing to raise a child conceived as a result of rape or incest.

When properly done, induced abortion is one of the safest procedures in medicine. In the United States, the risk of maternal mortality is 14 times lower after induced abortion than after childbirth. Unsafe abortions—those performed by people lacking the necessary skills, or in inadequately resourced settings—are responsible for between 5-13% of maternal deaths, especially in the developing world, though self-managed medication abortions are highly effective and safe. Public health data shows that making safe abortion legal and accessible reduces maternal deaths.

Modern methods use medication or surgery for abortions. The drug mifepristone in combination with prostaglandin appears to be as safe and effective as surgery during the first and second trimesters of pregnancy. The most common surgical technique involves dilating the cervix and using a suction device. Birth control, such as the pill or intrauterine devices, can be used immediately following abortion. When performed legally and safely on a woman who desires it, induced abortions do not increase the risk of long-term mental or physical problems. In contrast, unsafe abortions performed by unskilled individuals, with hazardous equipment, or in unsanitary facilities cause 47,000 deaths and 5 million hospital admissions each year. The World Health Organization states that "access to legal, safe and comprehensive abortion care, including post-abortion care, is essential for the attainment of the highest possible level of sexual and reproductive health".

Around 73 million abortions are performed each year in the world, with about 45% done unsafely. Abortion rates changed little between 2003 and 2008, before which they decreased for at least two decades as access to family planning and birth control increased. , 37% of the world's women had access to legal abortions without limits as to reason. Countries that permit abortions have different limits on how late in pregnancy abortion is allowed. Abortion rates are similar between countries that restrict abortion and countries that broadly allow it, though this is partly because countries which restrict abortion tend to have higher unintended pregnancy rates.

Historically, abortions have been attempted using herbal medicines, sharp tools, forceful massage, or through other traditional methods. Abortion laws and cultural or religious views of abortions are different around the world. In some areas, abortion is legal only in specific cases such as rape, fetal defects, poverty, risk to a woman's health, or incest. There is debate over the moral, ethical, and legal issues of abortion. Those who oppose abortion often argue that an embryo or fetus is a person with a right to life, and thus equate abortion with murder. Those who support the legality of abortion often argue that it is part of a woman's right to make decisions about her own body. Others favor legal and accessible abortion as a public health measure.

Types

Induced
Approximately 205 million pregnancies occur each year worldwide. Over a third are unintended and about a fifth end in induced abortion. Most abortions result from unintended pregnancies. In the United Kingdom, 1 to 2% of abortions are done due to genetic problems in the fetus. A pregnancy can be intentionally aborted in several ways. The manner selected often depends upon the gestational age of the embryo or fetus, which increases in size as the pregnancy progresses.

Specific procedures may also be selected due to legality, regional availability, and doctor or a woman's personal preference. Reasons for procuring induced abortions are typically characterized as either therapeutic or elective. An abortion is medically referred to as a therapeutic abortion when it is performed to save the life of the pregnant woman; to prevent harm to the woman's physical or mental health; to terminate a pregnancy where indications are that the child will have a significantly increased chance of mortality or morbidity; or to selectively reduce the number of fetuses to lessen health risks associated with multiple pregnancy. An abortion is referred to as an elective or voluntary abortion when it is performed at the request of the woman for non-medical reasons. Confusion sometimes arises over the term elective because "elective surgery" generally refers to all scheduled surgery, whether medically necessary or not.

Spontaneous

Miscarriage, also known as spontaneous abortion, is the unintentional expulsion of an embryo or fetus before the 24th week of gestation. A pregnancy that ends before 37 weeks of gestation resulting in a live-born infant is a "premature birth" or a "preterm birth". When a fetus dies in utero after viability, or during delivery, it is usually termed "stillborn". Premature births and stillbirths are generally not considered to be miscarriages, although usage of these terms can sometimes overlap.

Studies of pregnant women in the US and China have shown that between 40% and 60% of embryos do not progress to birth. The vast majority of miscarriages occur before the woman is aware that she is pregnant, and many pregnancies spontaneously abort before medical practitioners can detect an embryo. Between 15% and 30% of known pregnancies end in clinically apparent miscarriage, depending upon the age and health of the pregnant woman. 80% of these spontaneous abortions happen in the first trimester.

The most common cause of spontaneous abortion during the first trimester is chromosomal abnormalities of the embryo or fetus, accounting for at least 50% of sampled early pregnancy losses. Other causes include vascular disease (such as lupus), diabetes, other hormonal problems, infection, and abnormalities of the uterus. Advancing maternal age and a woman's history of previous spontaneous abortions are the two leading factors associated with a greater risk of spontaneous abortion. A spontaneous abortion can also be caused by accidental trauma; intentional trauma or stress to cause miscarriage is considered induced abortion or feticide.

Methods

Medical

Medical abortions are those induced by abortifacient pharmaceuticals. Medical abortion became an alternative method of abortion with the availability of prostaglandin analogs in the 1970s and the antiprogestogen mifepristone (also known as RU-486) in the 1980s.

The most common early first trimester medical abortion regimens use mifepristone in combination with misoprostol (or sometimes another prostaglandin analog, gemeprost) up to 10 weeks (70 days) gestational age, methotrexate in combination with a prostaglandin analog up to 7 weeks gestation, or a prostaglandin analog alone. Mifepristone–misoprostol combination regimens work faster and are more effective at later gestational ages than methotrexate–misoprostol combination regimens, and combination regimens are more effective than misoprostol alone. This regimen is effective in the second trimester. Medical abortion regimens involving mifepristone followed by misoprostol in the cheek between 24 and 48 hours later are effective when performed before 70 days' gestation.

In very early abortions, up to 7 weeks gestation, medical abortion using a mifepristone–misoprostol combination regimen is considered to be more effective than surgical abortion (vacuum aspiration), especially when clinical practice does not include detailed inspection of aspirated tissue. Early medical abortion regimens using mifepristone, followed 24–48 hours later by buccal or vaginal misoprostol are 98% effective up to 9 weeks gestational age; from 9 to 10 weeks efficacy decreases modestly to 94%. If medical abortion fails, surgical abortion must be used to complete the procedure.

Early medical abortions account for the majority of abortions before 9 weeks gestation in Britain, France, Switzerland, United States, and the Nordic countries.

Medical abortion regimens using mifepristone in combination with a prostaglandin analog are the most common methods used for second trimester abortions in Canada, most of Europe, China and India, in contrast to the United States where 96% of second trimester abortions are performed surgically by dilation and evacuation.

A 2020 Cochrane Systematic Review concluded that providing women with medications to take home to complete the second stage of the procedure for an early medical abortion results in an effective abortion. Further research is required to determine if self-administered medical abortion is as safe as provider-administered medical abortion, where a health care professional is present to help manage the medical abortion. Safely permitting women to self-administer abortion medication has the potential to improve access to abortion. Other research gaps that were identified include how to best support women who choose to take the medication home for a self-administered abortion.

Surgical

Up to 15 weeks' gestation, suction-aspiration or vacuum aspiration are the most common surgical methods of induced abortion. Manual vacuum aspiration (MVA) consists of removing the fetus or embryo, placenta, and membranes by suction using a manual syringe, while electric vacuum aspiration (EVA) uses an electric pump. These techniques can both be used very early in pregnancy. MVA can be used up to 14 weeks but is more often used earlier in the U.S. EVA can be used later.

MVA, also known as "mini-suction" and "menstrual extraction", or EVA can be used in very early pregnancy when cervical dilation may not be required. Dilation and curettage (D&C) refers to opening the cervix (dilation) and removing tissue (curettage) via suction or sharp instruments. D&C is a standard gynecological procedure performed for a variety of reasons, including examination of the uterine lining for possible malignancy, investigation of abnormal bleeding, and abortion. The World Health Organization recommends sharp curettage only when suction aspiration is unavailable.

Dilation and evacuation (D&E), used after 12 to 16 weeks, consists of opening the cervix and emptying the uterus using surgical instruments and suction. D&E is performed vaginally and does not require an incision. Intact dilation and extraction (D&X) refers to a variant of D&E sometimes used after 18 to 20 weeks when removal of an intact fetus improves surgical safety or for other reasons.

Abortion may also be performed surgically by hysterotomy or gravid hysterectomy. Hysterotomy abortion is a procedure similar to a caesarean section and is performed under general anesthesia. It requires a smaller incision than a caesarean section and can be used during later stages of pregnancy. Gravid hysterectomy refers to removal of the whole uterus while still containing the pregnancy.  Hysterotomy and hysterectomy are associated with much higher rates of maternal morbidity and mortality than D&E or induction abortion.

First trimester procedures can generally be performed using local anesthesia, while second trimester methods may require deep sedation or general anesthesia.

Labor induction abortion
In places lacking the necessary medical skill for dilation and extraction, or when preferred by practitioners, an abortion can be induced by first inducing labor and then inducing fetal demise if necessary. This is sometimes called "induced miscarriage". This procedure may be performed from 13 weeks gestation to the third trimester. Although it is very uncommon in the United States, more than 80% of induced abortions throughout the second trimester are labor-induced abortions in Sweden and other nearby countries.

Only limited data are available comparing this method with dilation and extraction. Unlike D&E, labor-induced abortions after 18 weeks may be complicated by the occurrence of brief fetal survival, which may be legally characterized as live birth. For this reason, labor-induced abortion is legally risky in the United States.

Other methods
Historically, a number of herbs reputed to possess abortifacient properties have been used in folk medicine. Among these are: tansy, pennyroyal, black cohosh, and the now-extinct silphium.

In 1978, one woman in Colorado died and another developed organ damage when they attempted to terminate their pregnancies by taking pennyroyal oil.
Because the indiscriminant use of herbs as abortifacients can cause serious—even lethal—side effects, such as multiple organ failure, such use is not recommended by physicians.

Abortion is sometimes attempted by causing trauma to the abdomen. The degree of force, if severe, can cause serious internal injuries without necessarily succeeding in inducing miscarriage. In Southeast Asia, there is an ancient tradition of attempting abortion through forceful abdominal massage. One of the bas reliefs decorating the temple of Angkor Wat in Cambodia depicts a demon performing such an abortion upon a woman who has been sent to the underworld.

Reported methods of unsafe, self-induced abortion include misuse of misoprostol and insertion of non-surgical implements such as knitting needles and clothes hangers into the uterus. These and other methods to terminate pregnancy may be called "induced miscarriage".  Such methods are rarely used in countries where surgical abortion is legal and available.

Safety

The health risks of abortion depend principally upon whether the procedure is performed safely or unsafely. The World Health Organization (WHO) defines unsafe abortions as those performed by unskilled individuals, with hazardous equipment, or in unsanitary facilities. Legal abortions performed in the developed world are among the safest procedures in medicine. In the United States as of 2012, abortion was estimated to be about 14 times safer for women than childbirth. CDC estimated in 2019 that US pregnancy-related mortality was 17.2 maternal deaths per 100,000 live births, while the US abortion mortality rate is 0.7 maternal deaths per 100,000 procedures. In the UK, guidelines of the Royal College of Obstetricians and Gynaecologists state that "Women should be advised that abortion is generally safer than continuing a pregnancy to term." Worldwide, on average, abortion is safer than carrying a pregnancy to term. A 2007 study reported that "26% of all pregnancies worldwide are terminated by induced abortion," whereas "deaths from improperly performed [abortion] procedures constitute 13% of maternal mortality globally." In Indonesia in 2000 it was estimated that 2 million pregnancies ended in abortion, 4.5 million pregnancies were carried to term, and 14-16 percent of maternal deaths resulted from abortion.

In the US from 2000 to 2009, abortion had a mortality rate lower than plastic surgery, lower or similar to running a marathon, and about equivalent to traveling  in a passenger car. Five years after seeking abortion services, women who gave birth after being denied an abortion reported worse health than women who had either first or second trimester abortions. The risk of abortion-related mortality increases with gestational age, but remains lower than that of childbirth. Outpatient abortion is as safe from 64 to 70 days' gestation as it before 63 days.

There is little difference in terms of safety and efficacy between medical abortion using a combined regimen of mifepristone and misoprostol and surgical abortion (vacuum aspiration) in early first trimester abortions up to 10 weeks gestation. Medical abortion using the prostaglandin analog misoprostol alone is less effective and more painful than medical abortion using a combined regimen of mifepristone and misoprostol or surgical abortion.

Vacuum aspiration in the first trimester is the safest method of surgical abortion, and can be performed in a primary care office, abortion clinic, or hospital. Complications, which are rare, can include uterine perforation, pelvic infection, and retained products of conception requiring a second procedure to evacuate. Infections account for one-third of abortion-related deaths in the United States. The rate of complications of vacuum aspiration abortion in the first trimester is similar regardless of whether the procedure is performed in a hospital, surgical center, or office. Preventive antibiotics (such as doxycycline or metronidazole) are typically given before abortion procedures, as they are believed to substantially reduce the risk of postoperative uterine infection; however, antibiotics are not routinely given with abortion pills. The rate of failed procedures does not appear to vary significantly depending on whether the abortion is performed by a doctor or a mid-level practitioner.

Complications after second trimester abortion are similar to those after first trimester abortion, and depend somewhat on the method chosen. The risk of death from abortion approaches roughly half the risk of death from childbirth the farther along a woman is in pregnancy; from one in a million before 9 weeks gestation to nearly one in ten thousand at 21 weeks or more (as measured from the last menstrual period). It appears that having had a prior surgical uterine evacuation (whether because of induced abortion or treatment of miscarriage) correlates with a small increase in the risk of preterm birth in future pregnancies. The studies supporting this did not control for factors not related to abortion or miscarriage, and hence the causes of this correlation have not been determined, although multiple possibilities have been suggested.

Some purported risks of abortion are promoted primarily by anti-abortion groups,
but lack scientific support. For example, the question of a link between induced abortion and breast cancer has been investigated extensively. Major medical and scientific bodies (including the WHO, National Cancer Institute, American Cancer Society, Royal College of OBGYN and American Congress of OBGYN) have concluded that abortion does not cause breast cancer.

In the past even illegality has not automatically meant that the abortions were unsafe. Referring to the U.S., historian Linda Gordon states: "In fact, illegal abortions in this country have an impressive safety record." According to Rickie Solinger,

Authors Jerome Bates and Edward Zawadzki describe the case of an illegal abortionist in the eastern U.S. in the early 20th century who was proud of having successfully completed 13,844 abortions without any fatality.
In 1870s New York City the famous abortionist/midwife Madame Restell (Anna Trow Lohman) appears to have lost very few women among her more than 100,000 patients—a lower mortality rate than the childbirth mortality rate at the time. In 1936, the prominent professor of obstetrics and gynecology Frederick J. Taussig wrote that a cause of increasing mortality during the years of illegality in the U.S. was that

Mental health

Current evidence finds no relationship between most induced abortions and mental health problems other than those expected for any unwanted pregnancy. A report by the American Psychological Association concluded that a woman's first abortion is not a threat to mental health when carried out in the first trimester, with such women no more likely to have mental-health problems than those carrying an unwanted pregnancy to term; the mental-health outcome of a woman's second or greater abortion is less certain. Some older reviews concluded that abortion was associated with an increased risk of psychological problems; however, they did not use an appropriate control group.

Although some studies show negative mental-health outcomes in women who choose abortions after the first trimester because of fetal abnormalities, more rigorous research would be needed to show this conclusively. Some proposed negative psychological effects of abortion have been referred to by anti-abortion advocates as a separate condition called "post-abortion syndrome", but this is not recognized by medical or psychological professionals in the United States.

A 2020 long term-study among US women found that about 99% of women felt that they made the right decision five years after they had an abortion. Relief was the primary emotion with few women feeling sadness or guilt. Social stigma was a main factor predicting negative emotions and regret years later.

Unsafe abortion

Women seeking an abortion may use unsafe methods, especially when it is legally restricted. They may attempt self-induced abortion or seek the help of a person without proper medical training or facilities. This can lead to severe complications, such as incomplete abortion, sepsis, hemorrhage, and damage to internal organs.

Unsafe abortions are a major cause of injury and death among women worldwide. Although data are imprecise, it is estimated that approximately 20 million unsafe abortions are performed annually, with 97% taking place in developing countries. Unsafe abortions are believed to result in millions of injuries. Estimates of deaths vary according to methodology, and have ranged from 37,000 to 70,000 in the past decade; deaths from unsafe abortion account for around 13% of all maternal deaths. The World Health Organization believes that mortality has fallen since the 1990s. To reduce the number of unsafe abortions, public health organizations have generally advocated emphasizing the legalization of abortion, training of medical personnel, and ensuring access to reproductive-health services.

A major factor in whether abortions are performed safely or not is the legal standing of abortion. Countries with restrictive abortion laws have higher rates of unsafe abortion and similar overall abortion rates compared to those where abortion is legal and available. For example, the 1996 legalization of abortion in South Africa had an immediate positive impact on the frequency of abortion-related complications, with abortion-related deaths dropping by more than 90%. Similar reductions in maternal mortality have been observed after other countries have liberalized their abortion laws, such as Romania and Nepal. A 2011 study concluded that in the United States, some state-level anti-abortion laws are correlated with lower rates of abortion in that state. The analysis, however, did not take into account travel to other states without such laws to obtain an abortion. In addition, a lack of access to effective contraception contributes to unsafe abortion. It has been estimated that the incidence of unsafe abortion could be reduced by up to 75% (from 20 million to 5 million annually) if modern family planning and maternal health services were readily available globally. Rates of such abortions may be difficult to measure because they can be reported variously as miscarriage, "induced miscarriage", "menstrual regulation", "mini-abortion", and "regulation of a delayed/suspended menstruation".

Forty percent of the world's women are able to access therapeutic and elective abortions within gestational limits, while an additional 35 percent have access to legal abortion if they meet certain physical, mental, or socioeconomic criteria. While maternal mortality seldom results from safe abortions, unsafe abortions result in 70,000 deaths and 5 million disabilities per year. Complications of unsafe abortion account for approximately an eighth of maternal mortalities worldwide, though this varies by region. Secondary infertility caused by an unsafe abortion affects an estimated 24 million women. The rate of unsafe abortions has increased from 44% to 49% between 1995 and 2008. Health education, access to family planning, and improvements in health care during and after abortion have been proposed to address consequences of unsafe abortion.

Incidence
There are two commonly used methods of measuring the incidence of abortion:
 Abortion rate – number of abortions annually per 1,000 women between 15 and 44 years of age; some sources use a range of 15–49.
 Abortion percentage – number of abortions out of 100 known pregnancies; pregnancies include live births, abortions, and miscarriages.

In many places, where abortion is illegal or carries a heavy social stigma, medical reporting of abortion is not reliable. For this reason, estimates of the incidence of abortion must be made without determining certainty related to standard error. The number of abortions performed worldwide seems to have remained stable in the early 2000s, with 41.6 million having been performed in 2003 and 43.8 million having been performed in 2008. The abortion rate worldwide was 28 per 1000 women per year, though it was 24 per 1000 women per year for developed countries and 29 per 1000 women per year for developing countries. The same 2012 study indicated that in 2008, the estimated abortion percentage of known pregnancies was at 21% worldwide, with 26% in developed countries and 20% in developing countries.

On average, the incidence of abortion is similar in countries with restrictive abortion laws and those with more liberal access to abortion. Restrictive abortion laws are associated with increases in the percentage of abortions performed unsafely. The unsafe abortion rate in developing countries is partly attributable to lack of access to modern contraceptives; according to the Guttmacher Institute, providing access to contraceptives would result in about 14.5 million fewer unsafe abortions and 38,000 fewer deaths from unsafe abortion annually worldwide.

The rate of legal, induced abortion varies extensively worldwide. According to the report of employees of Guttmacher Institute it ranged from 7 per 1000 women per year (Germany and Switzerland) to 30 per 1000 women per year (Estonia) in countries with complete statistics in 2008. The proportion of pregnancies that ended in induced abortion ranged from about 10% (Israel, the Netherlands and Switzerland) to 30% (Estonia) in the same group, though it might be as high as 36% in Hungary and Romania, whose statistics were deemed incomplete.

An American study in 2002 concluded that about half of women having abortions were using a form of contraception at the time of becoming pregnant. Inconsistent use was reported by half of those using condoms and three-quarters of those using the birth control pill; 42% of those using condoms reported failure through slipping or breakage. The Guttmacher Institute estimated that "most abortions in the United States are obtained by minority women" because minority women "have much higher rates of unintended pregnancy". In a 2022 analysis by the Kaiser Family Foundation, while people of color comprise 44% of the population in Mississippi, 59% of the population in Texas, 42% of the population in Louisiana (by the state Health Department), and 35% of the population in Alabama, they comprise 80%, 74%, 72%, and 70% of those receiving abortions.

The abortion rate may also be expressed as the average number of abortions a woman has during her reproductive years; this is referred to as total abortion rate (TAR).

Gestational age and method

Abortion rates also vary depending on the stage of pregnancy and the method practiced. In 2003, the Centers for Disease Control and Prevention (CDC) reported that 26% of reported legal induced abortions in the United States were known to have been obtained at less than 6 weeks' gestation, 18% at 7 weeks, 15% at 8 weeks, 18% at 9 through 10 weeks, 10% at 11 through 12 weeks, 6% at 13 through 15 weeks, 4% at 16 through 20 weeks and 1% at more than 21 weeks. 91% of these were classified as having been done by "curettage" (suction-aspiration, dilation and curettage, dilation and evacuation), 8% by "medical" means (mifepristone), >1% by "intrauterine instillation" (saline or prostaglandin), and 1% by "other" (including hysterotomy and hysterectomy). According to the CDC, due to data collection difficulties the data must be viewed as tentative and some fetal deaths reported beyond 20 weeks may be natural deaths erroneously classified as abortions if the removal of the dead fetus is accomplished by the same procedure as an induced abortion.

The Guttmacher Institute estimated there were 2,200 intact dilation and extraction procedures in the US during 2000; this accounts for <0.2% of the total number of abortions performed that year. Similarly, in England and Wales in 2006, 89% of terminations occurred at or under 12 weeks, 9% between 13 and 19 weeks, and 2% at or over 20 weeks. 64% of those reported were by vacuum aspiration, 6% by D&E, and 30% were medical. There are more second trimester abortions in developing countries such as China, India and Vietnam than in developed countries.

Motivation

Personal

The reasons why women have abortions are diverse and vary across the world. Some of the reasons may include an inability to afford a child, domestic violence, lack of support, feeling they are too young, and the wish to complete education or advance a career. Additional reasons include not being able or willing to raise a child conceived as a result of rape or incest.

Societal
Some abortions are undergone as the result of societal pressures. These might include the preference for children of a specific sex or race, disapproval of single or early motherhood, stigmatization of people with disabilities, insufficient economic support for families, lack of access to or rejection of contraceptive methods, or efforts toward population control (such as China's one-child policy). These factors can sometimes result in compulsory abortion or sex-selective abortion.

Maternal and fetal health
An additional factor is maternal health which was listed as the main reason by about a third of women in 3 of 27 countries and about 7% of women in a further 7 of these 27 countries.

In the U.S., the Supreme Court decisions in Roe v. Wade and Doe v. Bolton: "ruled that the state's interest in the life of the fetus became compelling only at the point of viability, defined as the point at which the fetus can survive independently of its mother. Even after the point of viability, the state cannot favor the life of the fetus over the life or health of the pregnant woman. Under the right of privacy, physicians must be free to use their "medical judgment for the preservation of the life or health of the mother." On the same day that the Court decided Roe, it also decided Doe v. Bolton, in which the Court defined health very broadly: "The medical judgment may be exercised in the light of all factors—physical, emotional, psychological, familial, and the woman's age—relevant to the well-being of the patient. All these factors may relate to health. This allows the attending physician the room he needs to make his best medical judgment."

Public opinion shifted in America following television personality Sherri Finkbine's discovery during her fifth month of pregnancy that she had been exposed to thalidomide. Unable to obtain a legal abortion in the United States, she traveled to Sweden. From 1962 to 1965, an outbreak of German measles left 15,000 babies with severe birth defects. In 1967, the American Medical Association publicly supported liberalization of abortion laws. A National Opinion Research Center poll in 1965 showed 73% supported abortion when the mother's life was at risk, 57% when birth defects were present and 59% for pregnancies resulting from rape or incest.

Cancer

The rate of cancer during pregnancy is 0.02–1%, and in many cases, cancer of the mother leads to consideration of abortion to protect the life of the mother, or in response to the potential damage that may occur to the fetus during treatment. This is particularly true for cervical cancer, the most common type of which occurs in 1 of every 2,000–13,000 pregnancies, for which initiation of treatment "cannot co-exist with preservation of fetal life (unless neoadjuvant chemotherapy is chosen)". Very early stage cervical cancers (I and IIa) may be treated by radical hysterectomy and pelvic lymph node dissection, radiation therapy, or both, while later stages are treated by radiotherapy. Chemotherapy may be used simultaneously. Treatment of breast cancer during pregnancy also involves fetal considerations, because lumpectomy is discouraged in favor of modified radical mastectomy unless late-term pregnancy allows follow-up radiation therapy to be administered after the birth.

Exposure to a single chemotherapy drug is estimated to cause a 7.5–17% risk of teratogenic effects on the fetus, with higher risks for multiple drug treatments. Treatment with more than 40 Gy of radiation usually causes spontaneous abortion. Exposure to much lower doses during the first trimester, especially 8 to 15 weeks of development, can cause intellectual disability or microcephaly, and exposure at this or subsequent stages can cause reduced intrauterine growth and birth weight. Exposures above 0.005–0.025 Gy cause a dose-dependent reduction in IQ. It is possible to greatly reduce exposure to radiation with abdominal shielding, depending on how far the area to be irradiated is from the fetus.

The process of birth itself may also put the mother at risk. According to Li et al., "[v]aginal delivery may result in dissemination of neoplastic cells into lymphovascular channels, haemorrhage, cervical laceration and implantation of malignant cells in the episiotomy site, while abdominal delivery may delay the initiation of non-surgical treatment."

History and religion

Since ancient times, abortions have been done using a number of methods, including herbal medicines acting as abortifacients, sharp tools through the use of force, or through other traditional medicine methods. Induced abortion has a long history and can be traced back to civilizations as varied as ancient China (abortifacient knowledge is often attributed to the mythological ruler Shennong), ancient India since its Vedic age, ancient Egypt with its Ebers Papyrus, and the Roman Empire in the time of Juvenal. One of the earliest known artistic representations of abortion is in a bas relief at Angkor Wat. Found in a series of friezes that represent judgment after death in Hindu and Buddhist culture, it depicts the technique of abdominal abortion.

In Judaism, the fetus is not considered to have a human soul until it is safely outside of the woman, is viable, and has taken its first breath. The fetus is considered valuable property of the woman and not a human life while in the womb. While Judaism encourages people to be fruitful and multiply by having children, abortion is allowed and is deemed necessary when a pregnant woman's life is in danger. Several religions, including Judaism, which disagree that human life begins at conception, support the legality of abortion on religious freedom grounds. In Islam, abortion is traditionally permitted until a point in time when Muslims believe the soul enters the fetus, considered by various theologians to be at conception, 40 days after conception, 120 days after conception, or quickening. Abortion is largely heavily restricted or forbidden in areas of high Islamic faith such as the Middle East and North Africa.

Some medical scholars and abortion opponents have suggested that the Hippocratic Oath forbade physicians in Ancient Greece from performing abortions; other scholars disagree with this interpretation, and state that the medical texts of Hippocratic Corpus contain descriptions of abortive techniques right alongside the Oath. The physician Scribonius Largus wrote in 43 CE that the Hippocratic Oath prohibits abortion, as did Soranus of Ephesus, although apparently not all doctors adhered to it strictly at the time. According to Soranus' 1st or 2nd century CE work Gynaecology, one party of medical practitioners banished all abortives as required by the Hippocratic Oath; the other party to which he belonged was willing to prescribe abortions only for the sake of the mother's health. In Politics (350 BCE), Aristotle condemned infanticide as a means of population control. He preferred abortion in such cases, with the restriction that it "must be practised on it before it has developed sensation and life; for the line between lawful and unlawful abortion will be marked by the fact of having sensation and being alive."

In the Catholic Church, opinion was divided on how serious abortion was in comparison with such acts as contraception, oral sex, and sex in marriage for pleasure rather than procreation. The Catholic Church did not begin vigorously opposing abortion until the 19th century. As early as ~100 CE, the Didache taught that abortion was sinful. Several historians argue that prior to the 19th century most Catholic authors did not regard termination of pregnancy before quickening or ensoulment as an abortion. Among these authors were the Doctors of the Church, such as St. Augustine, St. Thomas Aquinas, and St. Alphonsus Liguori. In 1588, Pope Sixtus V ( 1585–90) was the only Pope before Pope Pius IX (in his 1869 bull, Apostolicae Sedis) to institute a Church policy labeling all abortion as homicide and condemning abortion regardless of the stage of pregnancy. Sixtus V's pronouncement was reversed in 1591 by Pope Gregory XIV. In the recodification of 1917 Code of Canon Law, Apostolicae Sedis was strengthened, in part to remove a possible reading that excluded excommunication of the mother. Statements made in the Catechism of the Catholic Church, the codified summary of the Church's teachings, considers abortion from the moment of conception as homicide and called for the end of legal abortion.

Denominations that support abortion rights with some limits include the United Methodist Church, Episcopal Church, Evangelical Lutheran Church in America and Presbyterian Church USA. A 2014 Guttmacher survey of abortion patients in the United States found that many reported a religious affiliation: 24% were Catholic while 30% were Protestant. A 1995 survey reported that Catholic women are as likely as the general population to terminate a pregnancy, Protestants are less likely to do so, and evangelical Christians are the least likely to do so. A 2019 Pew Research Center study found that most Christian denominations were against overturning Roe v. Wade, which in the United States legalized abortion, at around 70%, except White Evangelicals at 35%.

Abortion has been a fairly common practice, and was not always illegal or controversial until the 19th century. Under common law, including early English common law dating back to Edward Coke in 1648, abortion was generally permitted before quickening (14–26 weeks after conception, or between the fourth and sixth month), and at women's discretion; it was whether abortion was performed after quickening that determined if it was a crime. In Europe and North America, abortion techniques advanced starting in the 17th century; the conservatism of most in the medical profession with regards to sexual matters prevented the wide expansion of abortion techniques. Other medical practitioners in addition to some physicians advertised their services, and they were not widely regulated until the 19th century when the practice, sometimes called restellism, was banned in both the United States and the United Kingdom.

Some 19th-century physicians, one of the most famous and consequential being American Horatio Storer, argued for anti-abortion laws on racist and misogynist as well as moral grounds. Church groups were also highly influential in anti-abortion movements, and religious groups more so since the 20th century. Some of the early anti-abortion laws punished only the doctor or abortionist, and while women could be criminally tried for a self-induced abortion, they were rarely prosecuted in general. In the United States, some argued that abortion was more dangerous than childbirth until about 1930 when incremental improvements in abortion procedures relative to childbirth made abortion safer. Others maintain that in the 19th century early abortions under the hygienic conditions in which midwives usually worked were relatively safe. Several scholars argue that, despite improved medical procedures, the period from the 1930s until the 1970s saw more zealous enforcement of anti-abortion laws, and concomitantly an increasing control of abortion providers by organized crime.

In 1920, Soviet Russia became the first country to legalize abortion after Lenin insisted that no woman be forced to give birth. Iceland (1935) and Sweden (1938) would follow suit to legalize certain or all forms of abortion. In Nazi Germany (1935), a law permitted abortions for those deemed "hereditarily ill", while women considered of German stock were specifically prohibited from having abortions. Beginning in the second half of the 20th century, abortion was legalized in a greater number of countries. In Japan, abortion was first legalized by the 1948 "Eugenics Protection Law" meant to prevent the births of "inferior" humans. , due to Japan's continuing strongly patriarchal culture and traditional views on women's societal roles, women who want an abortion must normally get written permission from their partner.

Society and culture

Abortion debate

Induced abortion has long been the source of considerable debate. Ethical, moral, philosophical, biological, religious and legal issues surrounding abortion are related to value systems. Opinions of abortion may be about fetal rights, governmental authority, and women's rights.

In both public and private debate, arguments presented in favor of or against abortion access focus on either the moral permissibility of an induced abortion, or the justification of laws permitting or restricting abortion. The World Medical Association Declaration on Therapeutic Abortion notes, "circumstances bringing the interests of a mother into conflict with the interests of her unborn child create a dilemma and raise the question as to whether or not the pregnancy should be deliberately terminated." Abortion debates, especially pertaining to abortion laws, are often spearheaded by groups advocating one of these two positions. Groups who favor greater legal restrictions on abortion, including complete prohibition, most often describe themselves as "pro-life" while groups who are against such legal restrictions describe themselves as "pro-choice".

Modern abortion law

Current laws pertaining to abortion are diverse. Religious, moral, and cultural factors continue to influence abortion laws throughout the world. The right to life, the right to liberty, the right to security of person, and the right to reproductive health are major issues of human rights that sometimes constitute the basis for the existence or absence of abortion laws.

In jurisdictions where abortion is legal, certain requirements must often be met before a woman may obtain a legal abortion (an abortion performed without the woman's consent is considered feticide). These requirements usually depend on the age of the fetus, often using a trimester-based system to regulate the window of legality, or as in the U.S., on a doctor's evaluation of the fetus' viability. Some jurisdictions require a waiting period before the procedure, prescribe the distribution of information on fetal development, or require that parents be contacted if their minor daughter requests an abortion. Other jurisdictions may require that a woman obtain the consent of the fetus' father before aborting the fetus, that abortion providers inform women of health risks of the procedure—sometimes including "risks" not supported by the medical literature—and that multiple medical authorities certify that the abortion is either medically or socially necessary. Many restrictions are waived in emergency situations. China, which has ended their one-child policy, and now has a two child policy, has at times incorporated mandatory abortions as part of their population control strategy.

Other jurisdictions ban abortion almost entirely. Many, but not all, of these allow legal abortions in a variety of circumstances. These circumstances vary based on jurisdiction, but may include whether the pregnancy is a result of rape or incest, the fetus' development is impaired, the woman's physical or mental well-being is endangered, or socioeconomic considerations make childbirth a hardship. In countries where abortion is banned entirely, such as Nicaragua, medical authorities have recorded rises in maternal death directly and indirectly due to pregnancy as well as deaths due to doctors' fears of prosecution if they treat other gynecological emergencies. Some countries, such as Bangladesh, that nominally ban abortion, may also support clinics that perform abortions under the guise of menstrual hygiene. This is also a terminology in traditional medicine. In places where abortion is illegal or carries heavy social stigma, pregnant women may engage in medical tourism and travel to countries where they can terminate their pregnancies. Women without the means to travel can resort to providers of illegal abortions or attempt to perform an abortion by themselves.

The organization Women on Waves has been providing education about medical abortions since 1999. The NGO created a mobile medical clinic inside a shipping container, which then travels on rented ships to countries with restrictive abortion laws. Because the ships are registered in the Netherlands, Dutch law prevails when the ship is in international waters. While in port, the organization provides free workshops and education; while in international waters, medical personnel are legally able to prescribe medical abortion drugs and counseling.

Sex-selective abortion

Sonography and amniocentesis allow parents to determine sex before childbirth. The development of this technology has led to sex-selective abortion, or the termination of a fetus based on its sex. The selective termination of a female fetus is most common.

Sex-selective abortion is partially responsible for the noticeable disparities between the birth rates of male and female children in some countries. The preference for male children is reported in many areas of Asia, and abortion used to limit female births has been reported in Taiwan, South Korea, India, and China. This deviation from the standard birth rates of males and females occurs despite the fact that the country in question may have officially banned sex-selective abortion or even sex-screening. In China, a historical preference for a male child has been exacerbated by the one-child policy, which was enacted in 1979.

Many countries have taken legislative steps to reduce the incidence of sex-selective abortion. At the International Conference on Population and Development in 1994 over 180 states agreed to eliminate "all forms of discrimination against the girl child and the root causes of son preference", conditions also condemned by a PACE resolution in 2011. The World Health Organization and UNICEF, along with other United Nations agencies, have found that measures to reduce access to abortion are much less effective at reducing sex-selective abortions than measures to reduce gender inequality.

Anti-abortion violence

In a number of cases, abortion providers and these facilities have been subjected to various forms of violence, including murder, attempted murder, kidnapping, stalking, assault, arson, and bombing. Anti-abortion violence is classified by both governmental and scholarly sources as terrorism. In the U.S. and Canada, over 8,000 incidents of violence, trespassing, and death threats have been recorded by providers since 1977, including over 200 bombings/arsons and hundreds of assaults. The majority of abortion opponents have not been involved in violent acts.

In the United States, four physicians who performed abortions have been murdered: David Gunn (1993), John Britton (1994), Barnett Slepian (1998), and George Tiller (2009). Also murdered, in the U.S. and Australia, have been other personnel at abortion clinics, including receptionists and security guards such as James Barrett, Shannon Lowney, Lee Ann Nichols, and Robert Sanderson. Woundings (e.g., Garson Romalis) and attempted murders have also taken place in the United States and Canada. Hundreds of bombings, arsons, acid attacks, invasions, and incidents of vandalism against abortion providers have occurred. Notable perpetrators of anti-abortion violence include Eric Robert Rudolph, Scott Roeder, Shelley Shannon, and Paul Jennings Hill, the first person to be executed in the United States for murdering an abortion provider.

Legal protection of access to abortion has been brought into some countries where abortion is legal. These laws typically seek to protect abortion clinics from obstruction, vandalism, picketing, and other actions, or to protect women and employees of such facilities from threats and harassment.

Far more common than physical violence is psychological pressure. In 2003, Chris Danze organized anti-abortion organizations throughout Texas to prevent the construction of a Planned Parenthood facility in Austin. The organizations released the personal information online of those involved with construction, sent them up to 1200 phone calls a day and contacted their churches. Some protestors record women entering clinics on camera.

Non-human examples

Spontaneous abortion occurs in various animals. For example, in sheep it may be caused by stress or physical exertion, such as crowding through doors or being chased by dogs. In cows, abortion may be caused by contagious disease, such as brucellosis or Campylobacter, but can often be controlled by vaccination. Eating pine needles can also induce abortions in cows. Several plants, including broomweed, skunk cabbage, poison hemlock, and tree tobacco, are known to cause fetal deformities and abortion in cattle and in sheep and goats. In horses, a fetus may be aborted or resorbed if it has lethal white syndrome (congenital intestinal aganglionosis). Foal embryos that are homozygous for the dominant white gene (WW) are theorized to also be aborted or resorbed before birth. In many species of sharks and rays, stress-induced abortions occur frequently on capture.

Viral infection can cause abortion in dogs. Cats can experience spontaneous abortion for many reasons, including hormonal imbalance. A combined abortion and spaying is performed on pregnant cats, especially in trap–neuter–return programs, to prevent unwanted kittens from being born. Female rodents may terminate a pregnancy when exposed to the smell of a male not responsible for the pregnancy, known as the Bruce effect.

Abortion may also be induced in animals, in the context of animal husbandry. For example, abortion may be induced in mares that have been mated improperly, or that have been purchased by owners who did not realize the mares were pregnant, or that are pregnant with twin foals. Feticide can occur in horses and zebras due to male harassment of pregnant mares or forced copulation, although the frequency in the wild has been questioned. Male gray langur monkeys may attack females following male takeover, causing miscarriage.

See also
Abortion doula
Forced abortion

Notes

References

Bibliography

External links 

 First-trimester abortion in women with medical conditions. US Department of Health and Human Services
 Safe abortion: Technical & policy guidance for health systems, World Health Organization (2015)

 
Human reproduction
Wikipedia medicine articles ready to translate
Wikipedia emergency medicine articles ready to translate